Shawn Steel (born ) is an American politician serving as the Republican National Committee Member from California since 2008. He was voted by his colleagues to the executive committee of the Republican National Committee in 2018. Steel served as Sergeant at Arms at the Republican National Convention in Cleveland, Ohio in 2016. In 2012, he served as Deputy Permanent Co-chairmen of the convention. He was elected as Chairman of the California Republican Party from 2001 to 2003.  He is the husband of Congresswoman Michelle Park Steel, who has represented California's 48th congressional district since 2021.

As the California Republican Party Chairman, Steel was the co-founder of the successful recall of Governor Gray Davis in 2003. Gov. Davis was recalled via a Recall Petition in which Steel was the first signatory of over 1,000,000 signatures.

Steel is a frequent guest on CNN, Fox, and local Los Angeles media. He published over 50 articles in a variety of publications ranging from the Wall Street Journal, San Diego Union, Sacramento Bee, Orange County Register, and Washington Times.

Steel is a trial attorney specializing in personal injury law and pioneered a specialty representing alternative health care providers, particularly chiropractors and acupuncturists. He regularly teaches at Palmer West Chiropractic, Life Chiropractic College West and Southern California University of Health Sciences and frequent lecturer for doctors re-licensing credit through California. Shawn Steel Law Firm, is located in Seal Beach, California.

Early life

Steel graduated from Van Nuys High School growing up in the San Fernando Valley. Steel's lifetime of conservative political activism began as a leader in the San Fernando Valley Youth for Goldwater (YFG). YFG was a youth group supporting Barry M. Goldwater of Arizona for the U.S. presidency. After the Goldwater defeat, he helped form numerous chapters of Young Americans for Freedom (YAF) in the Los Angeles region. Steel was statewide Chairman of Youth for Reagan for high school students. Steel became state Chairman of California of YAF.

Education
Steel received his Bachelor of Arts degree, with California state teaching credentials, from California State University, Northridge, his Master of Arts from the University of Southern California in Los Angeles, and his Juris Doctor from Northrop University in Inglewood, California.

California Republican Party
As California Republican Party Chairman, Steel was a co-founder of the Recall Davis movement. Along with Ted Costa, of Peoples Advocate, they were responsible for organizing the recall campaign against Governor Davis. The success of the recall resulted in Arnold Schwarzenegger's election as governor.

Steel was criticized by senior California Republican leaders as well as national leaders. Corporate raider Gerry Parsky, and President George W. Bush's unofficial representative in California questioned the strategy of recalling Gray Davis. Some party leaders objected to Steel's efforts to unseat Davis, fearing it was too risky. Steel at the CRP convention in February 2003 convinced an overwhelming majority to endorse the Recall, thus turning the tide for the recall campaign.

Career highlights
 2017 – Elected by Western States RNC Member to the RNC Executive Committee
 2008 – Elected as RNC California Committeeman
 2003 – Cofounded the successful recall campaign against then-incumbent Democratic Governor Gray Davis
 2001–2003 – Chairman of the California Republican Party

Public service
Steel teaches Ethics and Jurisprudence at Cleveland University-Kansas City in Los Angeles. He also is a regular lecturer at Palmer College of Chiropractic in San Jose and Southern California University of Health Services in Whittier. He was appointed by Republican Governor Pete Wilson to the California State Acupuncture Board. He was appointed in 1993 and served until 2000. Steel was elected by his peers as Chairman of the Acupuncture Board for two one-year terms.

Private practice
Steel's personal injury practice, Shawn Steel Law Firm, is based in Seal Beach, California.

Steel is known for having broken significant legal ground by representing family members of the notorious Jonestown massacre in Guyana in his early practice. More recently he has filed lawsuits against University of California, Berkeley seeking to protect First Amendment Freedom of Speech rights.

Chinese influence

In June 2020, Steel was linked by the Wall Street Journal to an effort by Chinese nationalists to influence the Trump administration. In May 2017, Steel held a gathering of GOP leaders to discuss campaign strategies and other issues.  The meeting reportedly included Chinese nationals working closely with China's national-security apparatus, and Chinese military representatives. After the news was reported, the Republican National Committee said it had instructed Mr. Steel to break ties with the people identified in the reports. Upon review, the Republican National Committee indicated that all activities were legally compliant with campaign-finance laws. In the article, Mr. Steel stated that it would be “false, defamatory, and offensive” to say he aided any Chinese efforts. In fact, Mr. Steel, a Republican national committeeman from California, found the article to be fictitious and false based on his anti-communism advocacy.  In several published articles, Mr. Steel criticized and confronted the Chinese Communist Party for human rights violations such as organ harvesting, ethnic minority oppression, and torture. He even went on to criticize how the Chinese Communist Party handled the coronavirus, pointing out that "China's ruthless Communist government quashes all dissenting opinions..."

Personal life 
Steel's wife is Congresswoman Michelle Park Steel, who has represented California's 48th congressional district since 2021. Prior to entering Congress, she served as an elected member of the Orange County Board of Supervisors from 2015 to 2021. She was first elected in 2006 as a member of the California Board of Equalization, serving there from 2007 to 2015. They have two children, Cheyenne Park Steel Klotz and Siobhan Cheong Steel.

References

Living people
1946 births
American lawyers
California Republican Party chairs
Van Nuys High School alumni
California State University, Northridge alumni
University of Southern California alumni
Northrop University alumni
Republican National Committee members
People from Seal Beach, California
American political consultants